Primera División de México (Mexican First Division) Clausura 2003 is a Mexican football tournament - one of two short tournaments that take up the entire year to determine the champion(s) of Mexican football. It began on Saturday, January 11, 2003, and ran until May 17, when the regular season ended. Celaya's franchise was bought out by the owner of Aerolineas Internacionales, Jorge Rodriguez Marie, and it was moved to Cuernavaca. Thus, creating a team that was known as Los Colibries de Morelos. Monterrey defeated Morelia to win their second championship.

Overview
The franchise that was known as Celaya was bought by Jorge Rodríguez Marié, who moved the team to Cuernavaca and changed its name to Colibríes de Cuernavaca. Such was the impact of his ownership that the team's nickname, Colibries, came from the logo of his airline, Aerolineas Internacionales, and the company's wordmark also appeared as a shirt sponsor.

Final standings (groups)

League table

Results

Top goalscorers 
Players sorted first by goals scored, then by last name. Only regular season goals listed.

Source: MedioTiempo

Playoffs

Preliminary round

5–5 on aggregate. Guadalajara advanced for being the higher seeded team.

Bracket

Quarterfinals

Morelia won 5–3 on aggregate.

Veracruz won 2–1 on aggregate.

Monterrey won 4–3 on aggregate.

UANL won 4–3 on aggregate.

Semifinals

Morelia won 2–1 on aggregate.

Monterrey won 5–3 on aggregate.

Finals

Monterrey won 3–1 on aggregate.

Relegation

Notes

References

External links
 Mediotiempo.com (where information was obtained)

Mexico
Clausura